Colomi is a locality in the Cochabamba Department in central Bolivia. It is the seat of the Colomi Municipality, the second municipal section of the Chapare Province. At the time of census 2001 it had a population of 3,699.

In 2021, 21 people were killed in a bus crash.

References

External links
 Map of Chapare Province

Populated places in Cochabamba Department